The 2013–14 Gonzaga Bulldogs men's basketball team represented Gonzaga University in the 2013–14 NCAA Division I men's basketball season. The team played its home games at the McCarthey Athletic Center, which has a capacity of 6,000. The Bulldogs (also informally referred to as the Zags) were in their 34th season as a member of the West Coast Conference, and were led by head coach Mark Few, who is in his 15th season as head coach. They finished the season 29–7, 15–3 in WCC play to be WCC regular season champions. They were also champions of the WCC tournament to earn an automatic bid to the NCAA tournament. In the NCAA Tournament, they defeated Oklahoma State in the second round before losing in the third round to Arizona.

Preseason
In 2013–14, the Gonzaga Bulldogs men's basketball team is in its 34th season as a member of the West Coast Conference. Since 2004, the team has played their home games at the McCarthey Athletic Center, which has a capacity of 6,000. In their previous season, a West Coast Conference Preseason Poll predicted that the Bulldogs would finish atop of the conference. The Zags finished in first place in the West Coast Conference Standings with a 16–0 conference record. The Bulldogs beat Saint Mary's in the West Coast Conference tournament, and captured their first number one ranking in school history. The team drew its first number one seed in school history in the 2013 NCAA tournament, where they lost to ninth-seed Wichita State in the third round, 76–70, and finished with a record of 32–3.

During the 2013 off-season, former Zags player Adam Morrison returned to the school, apparently deciding to end an injury-riddled professional career, and was added to Mark Few's staff as a student assistant.

Departures

Incoming transfers

2013 recruiting class

2014 recruiting class

2015 recruiting class

Roster

 Angel Nunez will have 2.5 years of eligibility remaining starting on December 21, 2013

Schedule
Gonzaga played 18 conference games (home-and-home) during the season. The Zags played three non-conference games at the Maui Invitational. A fourth Maui Invitational game was played against Oakland in Spokane on November 17.

|-
!colspan=12 style="background:#002965; color:white;"| Exhibition

|-
!colspan=12 style="background:#002965; color:white;"| Regular Season

|-
!colspan=12 style="background:#002965; color:white;"| WCC Tournament

|-
!colspan=12 style="background:#002965; color:white;"| NCAA tournament

Game summaries

Exhibition: Simon Fraser
Broadcasters: Greg Heister, Richard Fox and Dan Dickau

Bryant
Series History: First meeting
Broadcasters: Greg Heister, Richard Fox and Dan Dickau

Colorado State
Series History: Tied 1–1
Broadcasters: Roxy Bernstein & Miles Simon

Oakland
Series History: First meeting
Broadcasters: Greg Heister, Richard Fox & Dan Dickau

Washington State
Series History: Washington State leads 98–50
Broadcasters: Greg Heister, Richard Fox and Dan Dickau

Maui Invitational: Dayton
Series History: First meeting
Broadcasters: Sean McDonough and Jay Bilas

Maui Invitational: Chaminade
Series History: Gonzaga leads 1–0
Broadcasters: Jon Sciambi and Jimmy Dykes

Maui Invitational: Arkansas
Series History: First Meeting
Broadcasters: Jon Sciambi and Jimmy Dykes

Coppin State
Series History: First meeting
Broadcasters: Greg Heister, Richard Fox and Dan Dickau

New Mexico State
Series History: First Meeting
Broadcasters: Steve Quis and Jon Crispin

West Virginia
Series History: Gonzaga leads series 2–0
Broadcasters: Roxy Bernstein and Sean Farnham

South Alabama
Series History: Gonzaga leads series 2–0
Broadcasters: Greg Heister, Richard Fox, and Brad Adam

Wichita Wildcat Classic: Kansas State
Series History: Kansas State leads series 2–1
Broadcasters: Carter Blackburn and Sean Farnham

Santa Clara
Series History: Gonzaga leads series 49–30
Broadcasters: Roxy Bernstein and Miles Simon

San Francisco
Series History: Gonzaga leads series 46–22
Broadcasters: Greg Hesiter and Richard Fox

Saint Mary's
Series History: Gonzaga leads series 57–27
Broadcasters: Dave Flemming and Sean Farnham

Pacific
Series History: Gonzaga leads series 3–1
Broadcasters: Greg Hesiter and Richard Fox

Portland
Series History: Gonzaga leads series 91-65
Broadcasters: Roxy Bernstein and Jarron Collins

Rankings

See also
2013–14 Gonzaga Bulldogs women's basketball team

References

Gonzaga Bulldogs men's basketball seasons
Gonzaga
Gonzaga
Gonzaga Bulldogs men's basketball
Gonzaga Bulldogs men's basketball